Kawana, Queensland may refer to either of two locations in the Australian state of Queensland:

 Kawana Waters, Queensland, an urban centre on the Sunshine Coast
 Kawana, Queensland (Rockhampton), a suburb of the regional city Rockhampton